Elme Marie Caro (4 March 1826, Poitiers, Vienne13 July 1887, Paris) was a French philosopher.

Life
His father, a professor of philosophy, gave him an education at the Stanislas College and the École Normale, where he graduated in 1848. After being professor of philosophy at several provincial universities, he received the degree of doctor, and came to Paris in 1858 as master of conferences at the École Normale.

In 1861 he became inspector of the Academy of Paris, in 1864 professor of philosophy to the Faculty of Letters, and in 1874 a member of the Académie Française. 
He married Pauline Cassin, the author of Le Péché de Madeleine and other well-known novels.

In his philosophy, he was mainly concerned to defend Christianity against modern Positivism. The philosophy of Victor Cousin influenced him strongly, but his strength lay in exposition and criticism rather than in original thought.

He wrote  important contributions to La France and the Revue des deux Mondes.

Selected publications
Du mysticisme au XVIIIe siècle (1852–1854)
Études morales sur le temps présent (1855)
L'Idée de Dieu (1864)
Le matérialisme et la science (1867)
Jours d'épreuve (1872)
Le Pessimisme au XIXe siècle (1878)
La Philosophie de Goethe (2nd ed., 1880)
La fin du dix-huitième siècle (1881)
M. Littré et le positivisme (1883)
George Sand (1887)
Mélanges et portraits (1888)

References

Sources

External links
 
 

1826 births
1887 deaths
People from Poitiers
Members of the Académie Française
French philosophers
École Normale Supérieure alumni
Collège Stanislas de Paris alumni
French male non-fiction writers